Leif Lahn Jensen (born 29 June 1967 in Grenaa) is a Danish politician, who is a member of the Folketing for the Social Democrats political party. He was elected into parliament at the 2007 Danish general election.

Political career
Jensen was a member of the municipal council in Grenaa Municipality from 2002 to 2006. In 2007 the municipality was merged with the municipalities of Nørre Djurs, Rougsø and part of Sønderhald to form Norddjurs Municipality. Jensen sat in this municipal council from 2006 to 2007.

Jensen was elected into parliament in the 2007 election, and reelected in the 2011, 2015 and 2019 elections.

External links 
 Biography on the website of the Danish Parliament (Folketinget)

References 

1967 births
Living people
People from Norddjurs Municipality
Danish municipal councillors
Social Democrats (Denmark) politicians
Members of the Folketing 2007–2011
Members of the Folketing 2011–2015
Members of the Folketing 2015–2019
Members of the Folketing 2019–2022
Members of the Folketing 2022–2026